August Bach (30 August 1897 – 23 March 1966) was an East German Christian Democratic politician.

August Bach was born in Rheydt. From 1915 to 1918 he served in German army. After the War he studied History at the University of Berlin. He worked as a journalist during the Weimar Republic and he was a member of the liberal German Democratic Party. From 1922 to 1944 he was the editor of the Berliner Monatshefte.

After World War II, Bach was the co-founder of East German Christian Democratic Union in Thüringen and was elected in the provincial executive of the CDUD of Thüringen. In 1947 he joined the Society for German-Soviet Russian Friendship (DSF) and he served as the vice-chairman of the DSF-Thüringen (1949). Later he was a member of the Presidium of the DSF.

From May 1950 Bach was the editor of the Thüringen Daily and member of the CDU Executive Commission and the CDU Political Commission. From 1955 to 1958 he served as chairman of the Länderkammer (the upper house of Parliament).  A loyal supporter of the Communist SED regime, he helped push out those CDU members not willing to do the Communists' bidding, and led its formal transformation into a loyal partner of the SED in 1952.

After the death of Otto Nuschke, Bach was elected Chairman of the CDUD (as it was now known) in 1958. From 1958 to 1963 he was Vice-President of the Volkskammer and from 1963 to his death he served as member of the Presidium of the Volkskammer.

See also
 German Democratic Republic
 Christian Democratic Union (East Germany)

1897 births
1966 deaths
People from Mönchengladbach
People from the Rhine Province
Christian Democratic Union (East Germany) politicians
Members of the Provisional Volkskammer
Members of the 1st Volkskammer
Members of the 2nd Volkskammer
Members of the 3rd Volkskammer
Members of the 4th Volkskammer
Recipients of the Patriotic Order of Merit
Recipients of the Banner of Labor